Marina Claire Wheeler  (born 18 August 1964) is a British lawyer and writer. As a barrister, she specialises in public law, including human rights, and is a member of the Bar Disciplinary Tribunal. She was appointed Queen's Counsel in 2016.

She is the author of The Lost Homestead: My Mother, Partition and the Punjab (2020) and is an ex-wife of former British prime minister Boris Johnson.

Early life and education
Marina Claire Wheeler was born in West Berlin on 18 August 1964, to Charles Wheeler, a BBC correspondent, and his second wife Dip Singh, an Indian Punjabi Sikh. Her elder sister is Shirin Wheeler.

Wheeler was educated at Bedales School and then the European School of Brussels, and then in the early 1980s at Fitzwilliam College, Cambridge, where she wrote for the student magazine Cantab.

At the European School, she became friendly with Boris Johnson, later a journalist and politician.

Career
After Cambridge, Wheeler returned to Brussels and worked there for four years. In 1987, she was called to the Bar, practising from chambers in London at One Crown Office Row. In her work as a barrister, Wheeler specialises in mental health matters and discrimination claims. In January 2004, she was appointed to the B-Panel of Junior Counsel to the Crown. In 2009, she joined the Bar Disciplinary Tribunal as a barrister member.

Of her legal work, Wheeler has stated: 

In February 2016, she was appointed Queen's Counsel.

Personal life

On 8 May 1993, a pregnant Wheeler married her childhood friend Boris Johnson, whose previous marriage had ended 12 days earlier. They had met again and teamed up together in Brussels, where he was covering the European Parliament for The Daily Telegraph. Together they have four children, including Lara Lettice, their eldest child born 12 June 1993.

In September 2018, Johnson and Wheeler issued a statement confirming that after 25 years of marriage, they had separated "several months ago" and begun divorce proceedings. They reached a financial settlement in February 2020, and the divorce was finalised by November 2020.

In August 2019, Wheeler revealed that she had been diagnosed with cervical cancer earlier in the year and had undergone two operations to be in remission.

Memoirs

In 2020 her memoir The Lost Homestead: My Mother, Partition and the Punjab, detailing her family's history in India, was published. Her ancestry goes back to the city of Sargodha in West Punjab, present-day Pakistan, with her maternal family migrating to present-day India after the Partition of India. It was shortlisted for the 2021 RSL Christopher Bland Prize.

References

External links
 

1964 births
Alumni of Fitzwilliam College, Cambridge
Boris Johnson family
British columnists
British people of Indian descent
British people of Punjabi descent
British women lawyers
English barristers
English King's Counsel
Living people
Lawyers from London
21st-century King's Counsel
Spouses of prime ministers of the United Kingdom
British women columnists
Alumni of the European Schools
British women memoirists
21st-century memoirists